Jive Jones, JIVEjones, or simply JIVE (born August 30, 1984) is an American singer, songwriter, producer, model, and actor born and raised  in Miami, Florida.

Career

1990s—2000s: Production
Kleinman initially drew attention for his work in music production. He produced a number of songs for artists including Rachid, Mandy Moore, and Innosense.

2001: Me, Myself, & I
He released his debut solo album Me, Myself, & I on Jive Records. Singles released from the album include the title track, which was featured on the soundtrack to the film Big Fat Liar; and "I Belong", a guitar-driven love song.

Concurrently with his solo work, Kleinman continued to produce other artists' work as well, including Biohazard's sixth studio album, Uncivilization, released in September 2001.

Discography

Notes

External links

1980 births
Living people
Musicians from Miami
Singers from New York City
21st-century American singers
21st-century American male singers